"Dancin' Madly Backwards" (or "Dancing Madly Backwards") is a 1984 or 1985 single by The Flirts, a New York-based female vocal trio created by producer/songwriter Bobby Orlando.

Composition 
The song was written by C. Shore and produced by Bobby Orlando, Jürgen Korduletsch and Don Oriolo.

Charts

References 

1984 songs
1985 singles
The Flirts songs
Songs written by Bobby Orlando
Song recordings produced by Bobby Orlando